Amath Yashya or Amadh Yahya is a Cambodian politician. He belongs to the Sam Rainsy Party and was elected to represent Kampong Cham Province in the National Assembly of Cambodia in 2003. Yahya is an ethnic Cham.

References

Cambodian Cham people
Members of the National Assembly (Cambodia)
Living people
Cambodian Muslims
Candlelight Party politicians
Year of birth missing (living people)